Jain Center of Greater Phoenix (JCGP) is a Jain temple in Phoenix, Arizona. It was established in 2008. It represents about 150 families in the Phoenix metro area.

History

Of the total Jain population in Phoenix, about half live in the East Valley. Most arrived in the 1980s, at which time they did not have a permanent meeting place and met in local elementary schools.

In 2005, JCGP acquired 4 acres of land for building a Jain Temple in Phoenix. Pratistha event was held from December 20 to December 26, 2008. The temple is located at 6250 S. 23rd Ave. The Hindu community also has a temple on another four acres next to the Jain Center, known as the Shree Nathji temple.

Architecture
The building uses white Makrana marble on the inside. The primary deities have been brought in from India, 51-inch high statues of Mahavir and Adinath. Behind the primary deities, 24 inches have been carved out to include 15-inch-high statues of tirthankars. Above the sanctum sanctorum, a 61 feet pinnacle or shikhara has been constructed.

The entrance of the temple includes a sandstone archway and a 41-foot Manastambha (nonviolence monument) stands outside the temple.

Gallery

See also

Jainism in America
Jain Center of America
Brampton Jain Temple

References

Asian-American culture in Arizona
Jain temples in the United States
Religious buildings and structures in Arizona
21st-century Jain temples